Yabalkovets is a mountain village in Ardino Municipality, Kardzhali Province, southern-central Bulgaria. To the southeast is Chubrika. It covers an area of 11.232 square kilometres and as of 2013 had a population of 204 people.

In 2012, Yabulkovets Mountain Inn, a.k.a. Mountain View Wellness Complex, with 32 rooms, restaurant, sauna, Jacuzzi, steam bath, indoor and outdoor pools and other facilities opened.

Notable people
Faik Ismailov (1935 - 1995), writer

References

External links

Villages in Kardzhali Province